Alija Šuljak (1901–1992) was a prominent Bosnian Muslim Croat who was a professor, politician and military officer of Ustaše during World War II, best known as one of the main perpetrators of the genocide of Serbs in Eastern Herzegovina.

Early life 

Šuljak was born in village Zasad near Trebinje in 1901. He graduated at primary school in Trebinje and commercial secondary school in Sarajevo. He then attended high commercial school in Zagreb and Vienna.

Šuljak belonged to a group of notable Muslims who declared their ethnicity as Croatian and struggled for the Independent State of Croatia. The majority of Bosnian Muslims held this group in low regard by 1943. The main organizer of support of the Ustaše ideology in the region of Gacko was Alija Šuljak, a professor from Trebinje. Šuljak propagated Ustaše ideology in Gacko even before World War II, promoting fascism and disseminating religious and ethnic hatred toward Serbs.

Before World War II, Šuljak lived in Dubrovnik, as Ustaše commissioner for Dubrava County and professor at Commercial Academy. He was a member of Pobočnički zbor of the Main Ustaša Headquarters.

World War II 
When Axis forces occupied Yugoslavia in April 1941 and Ustaše proclaimed establishment of the Independent State of Croatia, Šuljak visited Ustaše leader Ante Pavelić during the first reception he organized on 24 April 1941 and on behalf of Muslims from Bosnia and Herzegovina held a greeting speech. 

Pavelić appointed Šuljak as Ustaše commissioner for the region of Eastern Herzegovina. and went to Gacko. Šuljak belonged to a group of Ustaše officials who incited the Muslims against the Serbs. Together with Andrija Artuković, Pavao Canki and Mijo Babić, Šuljak carried on the genocide of Serbs.

Šuljak dispatched first units of "Ustaše-Hunters" to Trebinje, his birthplace, and massacred the first victims of the Ustaše genocide in Herzegovina. 

He had an important role in the genocidal organization of Ustaše, holding the rank of "poglavni pobočnik". Šuljak became notorious for organizing aggressive Ustaša propaganda. After Treaties of Rome were signed, Šuljak came to Trebinje and hosted a conference of Croats and Muslims, where he tells them decision of Main Ustaša Headquarters and openly called for killing of Serbs and theft of their property. For that purpose, Ustaše camp was opened in Trebinje. On 27 May 1941 Šuljak and Togonal held a speech in a hotel in Gacko emphasizing that all Serbs were to be exterminated, and those who could not be exterminated were to be expelled to Serbia. 

At the end of the autumn of 1941, Šuljak went to the region of Borač and organized Ustaše units there who torched the Serb populated villages of Bodenište and Vratlo. Šuljak participated in the Holocaust in Croatia when he participated in the organization of Ustaše transport to Kerestinec camp of Jews on Krešimir Square in Zagreb in October 1941.

Šuljak belonged to a group of Muslims who supported the establishment of the 13th Waffen Mountain Division of the SS Handschar (1st Croatian).

Ante Pavelić awarded Šuljak with Order of Merit of first degree for his work in Ustaše movement, especially involvement in crimes in Herzegovina. He was also awarded Order of the German Eagle of the third degree.

Emigration 
After the World War II Šuljak fled Yugoslavia. He lived in Rome and Cairo before he finally settled in Istanbul.

Šuljak's son is Turkish businessman Nedim Šuljak, who was subjected to a police investigation in relation to international arms smuggling during and after the War in Bosnia.

Bibliography
 Suliak, Ali /Alija Suljak./ Initiation a la Cooperation Rurale. Tunis: "Proeres Social," 1961. Suljak, Alija.

References

Sources 

 
 
 
 
 
 
 
 
 

1901 births
1992 deaths
People from Trebinje
Ustaše
Bosniaks of Bosnia and Herzegovina convicted of war crimes
Bosniaks of Bosnia and Herzegovina convicted of crimes against humanity
Bosnia and Herzegovina people of World War II
Genocide of Serbs in the Independent State of Croatia perpetrators
Bosnian Muslim collaborators with Nazi Germany
Bosnian Muslim collaborators with Fascist Italy
Croatian fascists
Croatian irredentism
Croatian Muslims
Bosniaks of Croatia
Croatian exiles